Dragoljub Mićunović (born 14 July 1930) is a Serbian politician and philosopher. As one of the founders of the Democratic Party, he served as its leader from 1990 to 1994, and as the president of the parliament of Serbia and Montenegro from 2000 to 2004.

Early life
Mićunović was born on 14 July 1930 in Merdare, Kingdom of Yugoslavia. He spent his childhood in Skopje where his father Mile worked as a civil servant. Following the annexation of parts of Yugoslavia by the Italian puppet Albanian Kingdom and Axis Kingdom of Bulgaria, he sought refuge in the Territory of the Military Commander in Serbia. After World War II, he resumed high school in Kursumlija and Prokuplje. Mićunović was then sentenced to 20 months of forced labour at Goli Otok island by the Yugoslav authorities. 

After his release, he became an assistant at the University of Belgrade Faculty of Philosophy. He was part of the Marxist humanist Praxis School, and in 1975 he was expelled from the faculty, together with seven other colleagues.

Political career
Mićunović was one of the members of the Founding Committee of the Democratic Party in December 1989 who began the process of re-establishing the Democratic Party (DS). He was elected the first President of the re-established Democratic Party at the founding party conference on February 3, 1990.

At the first multi-party elections in Serbia in 1990, he was elected a Member of Parliament of Serbia on behalf of the Democratic Party. As a Member of Parliament on the state level, he was elected a delegate to the Chamber of the Republics and Provinces (upper chamber) of the Assembly of Yugoslavia in the period 1991-1992. At the Federal elections in 1992, Mićunović was elected a Member of the Federal Assembly as a representative of the Democratic Party. As a member of the opposition coalition “Zajedno”, he was re-elected a Member of Federal Assembly in the Chamber of Citizens (lower chamber) in 1996.

He remained the party's president until 1994, when he was squeezed out from the top spot by Zoran Đinđić. Mićunović resigned and with a group of prominent intellectuals, founded the Center for Democracy Fund, a non-governmental organization for the development of civil society and the non-governmental sector, civil education and preparation of political and social reforms.

In 1996, Dragoljub Mićunović founded a new political party, Democratic Centre, of which he was elected president.

At the federal elections in 2000, as one of the leaders of the Democratic Opposition of Serbia (DOS) coalition, Mićunović was again elected a Member of Parliament in the Chamber of Citizens of the Federal Assembly. After the victory of the Democratic Opposition of Serbia in October 2000, he was elected President of the Chamber of Citizens of the Federal Assembly on November 3, 2000. When the State Union of Serbia and Montenegro was established, in March 2003, Dragoljub Mićunović was elected President of the Parliament of Serbia and Montenegro on March 3 that year. He held this position to March 3, 2004.

Mićunović was a candidate at the 2003 Serbian presidential election, winning 35.42% of the popular vote, but the election was canceled due to low turnout (the turnout was 38.8%, considerably less than the 50% of eligible voters threshold required by Serbian law).

Dragoljub Mićunović's Democratic Centre party merged into the Democratic Party in 2004, and he was one of the leading candidates on the Democratic Party list in the Serbian Parliamentary elections held on January 21, 2007.

Dragoljub Mićunović is the winner of the first award for tolerance awarded by the Ministry for Human Rights, OSCE, and B92 TV and radio station. For his contribution to the admission of the Federal Republic of Yugoslavia to the Council of Europe he was presented an award by the European Movement in Serbia. In 2001 he was awarded by the Slovakian Ministry of Foreign Affairs for "active contribution to the work of the Community for democratic change in Yugoslavia which assembled representatives of different political parties, civil society and international organizations". In 2017, Dragoljub Mićunović signed the Declaration on the Common Language of the Croats, Serbs, Bosniaks and Montenegrins. In January 2020, he stated his opposition to the boycott of the 2020 parliamentary election.

References

External links

Interview with Mr. Mićunović in English
Memoirs of Mićunović    (in Serbian)

1930 births
Living people
People from Kuršumlija
Democratic Party (Serbia) politicians
Democratic Centre (Serbia) politicians
Candidates for President of Serbia
Members of the National Assembly (Serbia)
University of Belgrade Faculty of Philosophy alumni
Serbian democracy activists
Serbian humanists
Serbian political scientists
Yugoslav dissidents
Prisoners and detainees of Yugoslavia
Officiers of the Légion d'honneur
Signatories of the Declaration on the Common Language